Sadiyan may refer to:
 Sədiyan, Azerbaijan
 Sadian, Iran
Sadiyaan, a 2010 Bollywood film